Mary Douglas Glasspool (born February 23, 1954) is an assistant bishop in the Episcopal Diocese of New York. She previously served as a suffragan bishop in the Episcopal Diocese of Los Angeles from 2010 to 2016. She is the first avowed lesbian to be consecrated a bishop in the Anglican Communion.

Early life, education, and personal life
Glasspool was born on February 23, 1954, in Staten Island, New York, to the Reverend Douglas Murray Glasspool and Anne Dickinson. Later, the Glasspool family moved to Goshen, New York, where her father served as rector of St. James' Church until his death in 1989. Glasspool graduated from Dickinson College in Carlisle, Pennsylvania in 1976 and received her Master of Divinity degree from Episcopal Divinity School in Cambridge, Massachusetts, in 1981.

In 2019, Glasspool referred to Becki Sander as her "spouse of 31 years".

Ordained ministry
Glasspool was ordained a deacon in June 1981 by Bishop Paul Moore Jr. and a priest in March 1982 by Bishop Lyman Ogilby. In 1981, Glasspool became assistant to the rector at St. Paul’s Church in Chestnut Hill, Philadelphia, where she served until 1984. She was the rector of St. Luke's and St. Margaret's Church in Boston from 1984 to 1992, was the rector of St. Margaret's Episcopal Church, Annapolis, from 1992 to 2001, and served as canon to the bishops for the Episcopal Diocese of Maryland from 2001 to 2009.

Glasspool was elected a bishop suffragan on December 4, 2009, on the seventh ballot at the 115th convention of the Episcopal Diocese of Los Angeles in Riverside, California. On March 17, 2010, the Presiding Bishop's Office certified that her election had received the necessary consents. Glasspool was consecrated on May 15, 2010, in Long Beach, California, by the Presiding Bishop of the Episcopal Church, Katharine Jefferts Schori. Glasspool is the first avowed lesbian to be elected to the episcopate in the Episcopal Church or in the larger Anglican Communion, and is also the 17th woman elected to the episcopate in the Episcopal Church. Her election has gained worldwide attention in the context of the ongoing debate about gay bishops in Anglicanism. She served as bishop suffragan in the Episcopal Diocese of Los Angeles until 2016.

In 2015, Glasspool accepted the invitation to serve the Episcopal Diocese of New York, where she has been serving as an assistant bishop since 2016.

References

Women Anglican bishops
LGBT and Anglicanism
LGBT Anglican bishops
LGBT people from New York (state)
Lesbians
People from Goshen, New York
1954 births
Living people
Episcopal bishops of Los Angeles